Devosia soli is a Gram-negative, obligately aerobic, non-spore-forming, rod-shaped bacteria from the genus of Devosia which was isolated from greenhouse soil where lettuce (Lactuca sativa) grew, in the Daejeon City in the Republic of Korea.

References

External links
Type strain of Devosia soli at BacDive -  the Bacterial Diversity Metadatabase

Gram-negative bacteria
Hyphomicrobiales